George Henry Wickens (7 March 1878 – 14 June 1950) was an Australian rules footballer who played with Carlton in the Victorian Football League (VFL).

References

External links 

George Wickens's profile at Blueseum

1878 births
1950 deaths
Australian rules footballers from Melbourne
Carlton Football Club players
People from North Melbourne